LXV may refer to:

 65 (number) in Roman numerals
 LXV, the IATA and FAA LID code for Lake County Airport, United States